Domingo Felipe Blanco (born 22 April 1995) is an Argentine professional footballer who plays as a central midfielder for Ukrainian Premier League club Dnipro-1 and the Argentina national team.

Club career
Blanco started his senior career with Argentine Primera División side Olimpo in 2014, he was an unused substitute for a Copa Argentina match with Atlético de Rafaela on 22 July. On 9 February 2015, Blanco joined fellow Primera División team Independiente on loan. He made his professional debut on 17 April 2016 during an away win against Vélez Sarsfield. After two further appearances in 2016 and 2016–17, Independiente signed Blanco permanently in March 2017. Just over a year later, Blanco completed a loan move to Defensa y Justicia on 5 July 2018.

International career
On 7 March 2019, Blanco received a call-up from Argentina's Lionel Scaloni for friendlies with Venezuela and Morocco. He won his first cap on 22 March at the Wanda Metropolitano as they lost to Venezuela.

Career statistics

Club
.

International
.

Honours
Independiente
Copa Sudamericana: 2017

References

External links

1995 births
Living people
Sportspeople from Buenos Aires Province
Argentine footballers
Argentina international footballers
Association football midfielders
Olimpo footballers
Club Atlético Independiente footballers
Defensa y Justicia footballers
SC Dnipro-1 players
Argentine Primera División players
Argentine expatriate footballers
Expatriate footballers in Ukraine
Argentine expatriate sportspeople in Ukraine